Athena Protects the Young Hero (German: Der junge Held wird von Athena beschützt) is an 1854 sculpture by Gustav Bläser, installed on Schlossbrücke in Berlin, Germany.

See also

 1854 in art
 Greek mythology in popular culture
 Athenebrunnen

References

External links
 

1854 establishments in Germany
1854 sculptures
Ancient Greece in art and culture
Outdoor sculptures in Berlin
Sculptures of men in Germany
Sculptures of Athena
Statues in Germany